Swindon Corporation Tramways operated an electric passenger tramway service in Swindon between 1904 and 1929.

History

Swindon Corporation was the local council formed by the 1901 Municipal Borough charter, with the amalgamation of the Old and New Swindon councils; a power station was built in Corporation Street.

The corporation started to operate electric trams in 1904. A small fleet of nine 48 seater trams were bought at the time of inception with four further cars purchased at a later date.

In 1906, the Swindon Tram disaster occurred. A number 11 tram taking passengers from the Bath and West Show being held in Old Town suffered brake failure driving down Victoria Hill and crashed in Regents Circus killing 5.

Closure

After only 25 years of operation, Swindon's Trams were phased out by buses in 1929.

Tramcar 13 survived and is under restoration.

References

External links
 Swindon Corporation Tramways at the British Tramway Company Badges and Buttons website.
 Swindon Corporation Tramways Car 13 at the Vintage Carriages Trust website

Tram transport in England
Transport in Swindon
3 ft 6 in gauge railways in England